is a role-playing video game in the Metal Max series, which was developed and published by Japanese company Success for Android and iOS.

Gameplay 
Metal Saga: The Ark of Wastes is a role-playing video game. Similar as its predecessors, players needs to battle with enemies by themselves or by vehicles. There are several "Wanted" enemies, which powerful but worth of a lot of money.

In dungeons, player controls characters and/or vehicles by moving the Drum-styled virtual pad.

Development 
Metal Saga: The Ark of Wastes was first announced on November 26, 2014.

References

External links 

  

2015 video games
IOS games
Android (operating system) games
Metal Max
Video games developed in Japan